Lacon Township is located in Marshall County, Illinois, USA. As of the 2010 census, its population was 2,501 and it contained 1,116 housing units.

History
Lacon Township takes its name from Laconia, a region of Greece.

Geography

Demographics

See also 
 Lacon, Illinois

References

External links
City-data.com
Illinois State Archives

Townships in Marshall County, Illinois
Peoria metropolitan area, Illinois
Townships in Illinois
1849 establishments in Illinois